Simon Brown (November 29, 1802 – February 27, 1873) was an American politician who served as the 21st Lieutenant Governor for the Commonwealth of Massachusetts from 1855 to 1856. He was then an at-large delegate to the 1856 Republican Convention in Philadelphia where he supported the nomination of John C. Fremont.  Professionally, Brown was a printer and publisher, including of the New England Farmer, working in Boston. He died at Concord, Massachusetts of typhoid fever, in 1873.

References 

People from Concord, Massachusetts
Lieutenant Governors of Massachusetts
Massachusetts Know Nothings
1802 births
1873 deaths
Deaths from typhoid fever
Massachusetts Republicans